Garpax Records was an American record label, established by Gary S. Paxton, which first issued the song "Monster Mash" by Bobby "Boris" Pickett in 1962.  It was distributed by London Records.  The label lasted from 1962 to 1965.

References

Defunct record labels of the United States
London Records
Record labels established in 1962
Record labels disestablished in 1965